This list of ancient woods in England contains areas of ancient woodland in England larger than . The list is arranged alphabetically by ceremonial county.



B

Bedfordshire

The woodlands of Bedfordshire cover 6.2% of the county. Some two thirds of this is broad-leaved woodland, principally oak and ash. Of the eight woods shown, five fall roughly on the line of heavily wooded sandstone that runs diagonally across the county south of Bedford.

Berkshire

Berkshire has woodland covering , which is 14.5% of its land area. A major proportion of the area is the area of woodland along the Surrey and Buckinghamshire borders. This is Windsor Great Park and Forest, and as well as the woodland area listed here, it has vast tracts of heath and parkland. Also in the east of the county are woodlands on the southern end of the Chiltern Hills. The great majority of the woods listed are in West Berkshire and follow the line of the chalk hills across the county.

There is only one sizeable area of Ancient Woodland within Bristol. The Avon Gorge SSSI is partly within the city boundary, but the woodland is mainly in Somerset, so is covered under that county.

Buckinghamshire

9.4% of the land area of Buckinghamshire is Woodland.
Bernwood Forest
Burnham Beeches
Hollington Wood
Jones Hill Wood

C

Cambridgeshire

With one exception, these are all SSSIs. The woods are distributed very unevenly. Large areas of the fenland in the north-eastern side of the county have none. There are significant numbers in the south, toward Suffolk. More of the woods are found in the western half of the county, with three near Peterborough.

Cheshire

Cheshire has some 4% of its area under woodland - around half the national average. Since 1994 the Mersey Community Forest has been promoting new woodland planting within the Merseyside and Cheshire region to alleviate this deficit, and also better manage the existing woodland to secure its future. Cheshire has less ancient woodland, and in smaller units than most counties. Many of the ancient woodlands survive in steep valleys or cloughs, of small extent. Taylor's Rough, Wellmeadow Wood, Warburton's Wood And Well Wood are examples of clough woodland too small for inclusion in this list.

City of London
No Ancient Woodland remains in the City of London although the City of London Corporation are directly responsible for large areas of woodland elsewhere, notably Epping Forest (Essex), Highgate Wood (Greater London) and Burnham Beeches (Bucks)

Cornwall

The county of Cornwall has woodland representing 7.5% of the Land Area.

Steeple Woods -16.2 Ha (40 acres)

Devichoys Wood -16 Ha (40 acres)

Cumbria

9.5% of the land area of Cumbria is woodland.
Whinfell Forest

D

Derbyshire
Shining Cliff Wood

Devon
Wistman's Wood

Dorset
Duncliffe Wood
Holt Heath
Powerstock Common
Thorncombe Wood

Durham
Brignall Banks SSSI
Castle Eden Dene SSSI and NNR
Hawthorn Dene SSSI
Hesleden Dene
Deepdale Wood
 Pontburn Woods
Derwent Gorge SSSI and NNR

E

East Riding of Yorkshire
 Burton Bushes in Beverley Westwood

East Sussex
16.7% of the land area of East Sussex is woodland.

Essex
Epping Forest
Hadleigh Woods
Hockley Woods SSSI
Hatfield Forest SSSI
Nevendon Bushes
Norsey Wood

G

Gloucestershire
11.2% of the land area of Gloucestershire is woodland.
Forest of Dean
Lower Woods

Greater London
Bluebell Wood
Cherry Tree Wood
Coldfall Wood
Highgate Wood
Lesnes Abbey Woods
Oxleas Wood SSSI
Queen's Wood
Ruislip Woods NNR
Great North Wood
Scratchwood

Greater Manchester
Borsdane Wood

H

Hampshire
17.7% of the Land Area of Hampshire is woodland.

New Forest

Herefordshire
 Queenswood

Hertfordshire
9.5% of Hertfordshire's land area is woodland.

 Ashridge Estate
 Benington High Wood
 Birchanger Wood, near Bishop's Stortford
 Broxbourne Woods NNR, near Broxbourne
 Bush Wood
 Knebworth Woods
 Northaw Great Wood
 Sherrardspark Wood, near Welwyn Garden City
 Whippendell Wood, Watford

I

Isle of Wight
In 2012 the Isle of Wight Biodiversity Partnership commissioned a revised Ancient Woodland Inventory for the island, and this was completed in 2014. This has a list of all identified ancient woodland sites on the Isle of Wight. 
Brading Wood, part of the Brading Marshes RSPB reserve
Parkhurst Forest

K

Kent
10.6% of Kent's land area is wooded, and it has more ancient woodland than any other county.
Barrows Wood, Trundle Wood and High Wood around Wormshill
Chattenden Woods and Lodge Hill SSSI
Cobham Woods
Combwell Wood
Darenth Wood SSSI
East Blean Woods NNR
Ham Street Woods NNR
Parsonage Wood SSSI
Robins Wood SSSI
South Blean
West Blean NNR 
Westerham Wood SSSI
Yockletts Bank SSSI

L

Lancashire
 Boilton, Nab, Red Scar & Tun Brook woods, Preston

Leicestershire

It is estimated that 2% of Leicestershire's land area is ancient woodland, of which half has been replaced by new plantings in recent times. There are over 100 woods in Leicestershire believed to be ancient. With one group of woods near Hinckley, in the south-west, the remainder fall into three broad areas. In East Leicestershire, close to the border with Rutland, are the woods near Leighfield Forest, an extensive Royal Forest which straddled the two counties. North west of Leicester are the woods of Charnwood Forest. Further west are the woods of the coal measures toward the border with Derbyshire.

Lincolnshire
Bradley and Dixon Woods, Grimsby 
Legbourne Wood, Legbourne, Louth 
Stapleford Woods, Stapleford, North Kesteven
Reddings Woods, Kirkby on Bain, Lincolnshire, East Lindsey

M

Merseyside
Dibbinsdale, Wirral Hundred, Merseyside

N

Norfolk
Foxley Wood
Wayland Wood

North Yorkshire
Grass Wood, Wharfedale
Nidd Gorge, Knaresborough

Northamptonshire

The ancient woods of Northants are concentrated towards the south and west of the county, to that region bordering Bucks, Oxford and Beds. Many are managed by the Forestry Commission, although others are in private hands. They tend to occur on limestone soils in elevated country, and exhibit a diversity of habitats.
Hazleborough Wood, part of Whittlewood Forest
Royal Forest of Rockingham
Salcey Forest
Whittlewood Forest
Yardley Chase SSSI

Northumberland

 Allen Banks and Steward Gorge
 Whittle Dene

Nottinghamshire
Sherwood Forest

O

Oxfordshire

The ancient woods of Oxfordshire are concentrated in three distinct areas. In the south are woods of the Chiltern Hills. A second cluster lies to the east of Oxford. The Cotswolds woods on the western side of the county include those in the Royal Forest of Wychwood. Some  of woodland is split among the 3,390 woods smaller than 10 ha. Many of these smaller woods may be ancient, but are not covered by this list. The list here covers woods of over 10 ha with SSSI status.

R

Rutland
Burley Wood
Prior's Coppice

S

Shropshire
Wyre Forest NNR (also in Worcestershire)

Somerset

Somerset is a rural county of rolling hills such as the Blackdown Hills, Mendip Hills, Quantock Hills and Exmoor National Park, and large flat expanses of land including the Somerset Levels. Many of the woodland areas have been designated as SSSIs with some being managed by the Avon Wildlife Trust or Somerset Wildlife Trust. Woodland covers seven per cent of the land area of the county.

South Yorkshire
Bagger Wood
Beeley Wood
Watchley Crags

Staffordshire
Cannock Chase SSSI

Suffolk
Arger Fen and Spouses Grove
Assington Thicks
Bradfield Woods NNR
Bull's Wood
Foxburrow Wood (Suffolk)
Palant's Grove
Snakes Wood
Staverton Park and the Thicks
Wolves Wood

Surrey
22.4% of the Land Area of Surrey is woodland  this makes it the most wooded county in England.

T

Tyne and Wear
 Thornley Wood SSSI 
Derwent Walk Country Park woods
 Stanley Burn Wood
 Snipes Dene Wood, part of Gibside SSSI
 Lands Wood, Winlaton Mill

W

Warwickshire
Bush Wood
Rough Hill Wood
Ryton Wood SSSI

West Midlands
Sutton Park SSSI
Rough Wood

West Sussex
18.9% of West Sussex's land area is woodland.
Titnore Wood
Kingley Vale NNR
Worth Forest

West Yorkshire
Batty's Wood

Wiltshire
Savernake forest SSSI
Vincients Wood

Worcestershire
Grafton Wood
Laight Rough
 Pepper Wood
Shrawley Wood
Wyre Forest (also in Shropshire)

See also
Ancient Woodland
English land law
Forest of Lyme

Notes

References

External links
 What is Ancient Woodland?

Ancient Woods in England
 Ancient Woods
Old-growth forests
Ancient Woods